Tetyana Igorivna Kitayeva (born 28 October 1995) is a Ukrainian footballer who plays as a midfielder for Spanish Primera Federación club SE AEM and the Ukraine women's national team.

References

External links
Tetyana Kitayeva at BDFútbol

1995 births
Living people
Ukrainian women's footballers
Women's association football midfielders
WFC Zhytlobud-2 Kharkiv players
SE AEM players
Segunda Federación (women) players
Ukraine women's international footballers
Ukrainian expatriate women's footballers
Ukrainian expatriate sportspeople in Spain
Expatriate women's footballers in Spain